Gabriel Cristian Velcovici (born 2 October 1984), is a Romanian former football player.

Honours
Universitatea Craiova
Divizia B: 2005–06

External links

1984 births
Living people
Sportspeople from Craiova
Romanian footballers
Association football defenders
Liga I players
Liga II players
FC U Craiova 1948 players
ACF Gloria Bistrița players
CS Turnu Severin players
FC Olt Slatina players
CS Universitatea Craiova players